The 1985 Ottawa Rough Riders finished the season in 3rd place in the East Division with a 7–9 record. The team lost the East-Semi Final game to the Montreal Concordes.

Offseason

CFL Draft

Preseason

Regular season

Standings

Schedule

Postseason

Awards and honours

CFL Awards
None

CFL All-Stars
P – Ken Clark

References

Ottawa Rough Riders seasons
1985 Canadian Football League season by team